Lakeside Park, formerly known as Lakeside International Raceway is a motor racing circuit located in Kurwongbah, Moreton Bay Region, Queensland, Australia.

The circuit was known as the spiritual home of Queensland motorsport and was built by volunteers and borrowed machinery in the 1960s. The  circuit opened in 19 March 1961 and was closed in mid-2001. The circuit reopened on 5 April 2008, with a race meeting held the following day.

History
Lakeside was built between 1959 and 1960 by the Queensland Motor Sporting Club. The opening meeting was staged on Sunday 19 March 1961, and the first international meeting was held the following year, with the feature race won by Jack Brabham in a Cooper-Climax. 
The circuit was the venue for a wide range of racing series including the Australian Grand Prix on two occasions, the Australian Touring Car Championship, the Australian Superbike Championship and the Tasman Series, playing host to such names as Jim Clark, Jackie Stewart, Jack Brabham, Graham Hill and Chris Amon.

The fast and challenging nature of the circuit was an education for a generation of Queensland racing drivers and riders, including: John French, Dick Johnson, Gregg Hansford, Tony Longhurst, Will Power and five time 500cc Grand Prix motorcycle road racing world champion Mick Doohan.

Touring cars were a mainstay of the circuit's popularity, with the venue hosting the single race Australian Touring Car Championship titles in both 1964 and 1967. Following the change to a series format, Lakeside staged rounds of the ATCC in most years from 1970 to 1998. For much of the circuit's life these meetings were the largest of the year and played host to some brilliant racing, the highlight of which was the 1981 title showdown between local hero Dick Johnson and reigning champion Peter Brock. Despite a wounded car Johnson won the race and the title in front of his home crowd and secured for himself a future in the sport after almost 20 years of battling at times just to compete. Touring cars left Lakeside after the 1998 season, increasing the circuits decline as a venue.

2001 closure
Although national championship racing was still being held at the circuit in July 2001 declining revenues, mounting debts, court proceedings, an increasingly hostile local council and competition for event with the nearby Queensland Raceway led to the circuit's closure in 2001.

Revival campaign
During the seven years the circuit was closed, several organisations and activist groups made up of competitors, fans and driver training advocates have campaigned to have the circuit reopen.

'Friends of Lakeside', led by Robert Hardacre and Trevor 'Shelby' Beutel compiled much data relating to the history of Lakeside and were able to initially have the circuit listed on the Queensland Heritage Register, which is the main reason why the local council were prevented from demolishing the track and facilities. Friends of Lakeside is a small group with the aims of preserving Lakeside as the home of historic and modern era motorsport for all.

'Lakeside Motor Racing Enthusiasts' is composed of both car and primarily motorcycle aficionados from 17 to 70 years old and hail from all various motoring fraternities and niches conceivable.

2008 reopening
On 18 December 2007, Pine Rivers Shire Council and Queensland Raceway (Wrexmere Pty Ltd) signed off on a 30-year-long-term lease (with an option for 10 years) to operate the facility, including both driver training and racing. Racing was limited by noise (95db) and time constraints as a means of ensuring neighbourhood management.

The circuit reopened during 2008 strictly as a local racing venue, and the new operators, the owners of Queensland Raceway, have no ambitions to hold national level meetings, preferring to use the better quality facilities at their sister-circuit for higher level meetings. Lakeside was closed during the summer of 2008/2009 while QR staff and volunteers refurbished and widened the circuit.

During the refurbishment a tunnel was also added underneath the circuit just before the foot bridge. The circuit is now 12m wide on the exit of Shell Corner, previously it was 8m wide at this point. The Bus Stop was not resurfaced, and neither was a short stretch between Hungry and Eastern Loop. The majority of the bumps were removed during the resurfacing. Further upgrades following these works in 2011 involved removing the Armco barriers on the inside of the track on the exit of Karousel. A sand trap was added and the runoff area increased and concrete barriers installed. The track reopened after the refurbishment in early 2009 and has remained open since, although its ongoing operation is under threat due to repeated breaches of the venues' 70db noise restrictions.

Major race results

Australian Grand Prix
Lakeside hosted the Australian Grand Prix in 1966 and again in 1969. These two races also formed part of the Tasman Series.

Tasman Series
Along with the AGP in 1966 and 1969, Lakeside hosted a round of the Tasman Series in 1964 and 1967. Both races were won by World Formula One Champion drivers, Australia's own Jack Brabham in 1964 and Scotland's Jim Clark in 1967.

Australian Drivers' Championship
Lakeside hosted 17 rounds of the Australian Drivers' Championship for the CAMS Gold Star between 1963 and 1994.

* Lakeside hosted two rounds of the 1993 Australian Drivers' Championship (both held on the same day). Mark Larkham won Round 3 and Mark Skaife won Round 4.

Australian Touring Car Championship

Between 1964 and 1998, Lakeside hosted the Australian Touring Car Championship on 29 occasions. The first two in 1964 and 1967 were when the championship was only a single race before changing to a series in 1969. Lakeside also hosted two rounds of the championship in 1991.

* Lakeside hosted two rounds of the 1991 Australian Touring Car Championship. Jim Richards won Round 4 while Tony Longhurst won Round 8.

Australian Super Touring Championship
Lakeside hosted the Australian Super Touring Championship (known as the Australian 2.0 Litre Touring Car Championship in 1993 and Australian Manufacturers' Championship in 1994) 8 times between 1993 and 2000–01.

Australian GT Championship
Another national championship that Lakeside hosted was the Australian GT Championship. Lakeside held its first race of the championship in 1962, then had to wait another 20 years before the championship returned in 1982 for a 5-year run that ended with CAMS discontinuing the championship after 1985.

Australian Sports Car Championship
The Australian Sports Car Championship raced at Lakeside on 5 occasions between 1977 and 1985.

Australian Sports Sedan Championship
The Australian Sports Sedan Championship raced at Lakeside on 9 occasions between 1978 and 1985.

* Lakeside hosted two rounds of the 1991, 1992 and 1993 championships with both rounds held on the same day.

Australian Formula 2 Championship
Australian Formula 2 Championship raced at Lakeside on 7 occasions between 1970 and 1988. The 1971 and 1988 races were part of the Australian Drivers' Championship for the CAMS Gold Star.

Lap records

The official fastest race lap records at the Lakeside International Raceway are listed as:

References

External links
Official site
Friends of Lakeside Official site
Drive your own road car at Lakeside Raceway

Motorsport venues in Queensland
Former Supercars Championship circuits
Sport in Brisbane
Australian Grand Prix
Kurwongbah, Queensland
Buildings and structures in Moreton Bay Region